Mauricio Estívariz (born 9 September 1986) is a Bolivian former professional tennis player.

Estívariz, who had a best singles world ranking of 653, was a regular member of the Bolivia Davis Cup team between 2004 and 2010, winning 18 of his 31 rubbers. He was also a Bolivarian Games gold medalist for Bolivia.

In 2011, as his tennis career was winding down, he trialled for La Paz FC as a goalkeeper.

Estívariz served as non-playing captain of Bolivia in the 2018 Davis Cup.

ITF Futures finals

Singles: 2 (0–2)

Doubles: 7 (3–4)

References

External links
 
 
 

1986 births
Living people
Bolivian male tennis players